Slovenia entered the Eurovision Song Contest 2003, represented by Karmen Stavec with the song "Nanana". The song, performed in Slovene as "Lep poletni dan", was the winner of the Slovene national final, EMA 2003.

Before Eurovision

EMA 2003 

EMA 2003 was the 8th edition of the Slovenian national final format Evrovizijska Melodija (EMA). The competition was used by RTV Slovenija to select Slovenia's entry for the Eurovision Song Contest 2003.

Competing entries 
88 entries were received by RTV Slovenija during a submission period. An expert committee consisting of Armando Šturman, Martin Žvelc, Branka Kraner and Aleš Strajnar selected sixteen artists and songs for the competition from the received submissions.

Final 
EMA 2003 took place on 15 February 2003 at the Gospodarsko Razstavisce in Ljubljana, hosted by Miša Molk and Peter Poles. The winner was selected over two rounds of voting. In the first round, the combination of points from a public vote and a five-member jury panel selected the top three entries to proceed to the superfinal: "Lep poletni dan" performed by Karmen Stavec, "Prvič in zadnjič" performed by Nuša Derenda and "Poglej me v oči" performed by Alenka Godec. The jury consisted of Andi Knoll, Marija Naumova, Paul de Leeuw, Drago Ivanuša and Branka Kraner. The favourite of the public vote, Bepop, was eliminated after receiving no points from the jury. In the superfinal, a public vote selected "Lep poletni dan" performed by Karmen Stavec as the winner.

At Eurovision
"Lep poletni dan" was performed as "Nanana" at Eurovision, where it closed to the contest, performing 26th in the running order, following Sweden. The Slovene public were able to vote for the winner of the contest through televoting after all songs had performed.

At the close of the voting, Slovenia received 7 points, 4 from Bosnia & Herzegovina and 3 from Croatia. Slovenia gave the decisive votes of the contest: with Belgium leading Turkey by five points at the top of the scoreboard, Slovenia gave three points to Belgium, 10 to Turkey and 12 to third place Russia, giving Turkey to final victory. As Slovenia failed to reach the top 11 in the final, the country was forced to compete in the semi-final of the 2004 Contest.

Voting

References

External links
Slovene National Final 2003

2003
Countries in the Eurovision Song Contest 2003
Eurovision